The Hugo Award for Best Professional Editor is one of the Hugo Awards given each year for science fiction or fantasy stories published or translated into English during the previous calendar year. The award is available for editors of magazines, novels, anthologies, or other works related to science fiction or fantasy. The award supplanted a previous award for professional magazine. The Hugo Awards have been described as "a fine showcase for speculative fiction" and "the best known literary award for science fiction writing".

The award was first presented in 1973, and was given annually through 2006. Beginning in 2007, the award was split into two categories, that of Best Editor (Short Form) and Best Editor (Long Form). The Short Form award is for editors of anthologies, collections or magazines, while the Long Form award is for editors of novels. In addition to the regular Hugo awards, beginning in 1996 Retrospective Hugo Awards, or "Retro Hugos", have been available to be awarded for years 50, 75, or 100 years prior in which no awards were given. To date, Retro Hugo awards have been awarded for 1939, 1941, 1943–1946, 1951, and 1954, and in each case an award for professional editor was given.

During the 58 nomination years, 80 editors have been nominated for the original Best Professional Editor, the Short Form, or the Long Form award, including Retro Hugos. Of these, Gardner Dozois has received the most awards, with 15 original awards out of 19 nominations for the original category and 1 out of 2 for the Short Form. The only other editors to win more than three awards are Ellen Datlow, who won 9 of 18 nominations, split between the original and short form awards, Ben Bova, who won 6 of 8 nominations for the original award, and John W. Campbell, Jr. with 8 out of 8 nominations for the Retro Hugo awards. The two editors who have won three times are Edward L. Ferman with 3 out of 20 original nominations and Patrick Nielsen Hayden with 3 out of 4 Long Form nominations. Stanley Schmidt has received the most nominations, at 27 original and 7 Short Form, winning one Short Form.

Selection
Hugo Award nominees and winners are chosen by supporting or attending members of the annual World Science Fiction Convention, or Worldcon, and the presentation evening constitutes its central event. The selection process is defined in the World Science Fiction Society Constitution as instant-runoff voting with six nominees, except in the case of a tie. The works on the ballot are the six most-nominated by members that year, with no limit on the number of works that can be nominated. Initial nominations are made by members in January through March, while voting on the ballot of six nominations is performed roughly in April through July, subject to change depending on when that year's Worldcon is held. Prior to 2017, the final ballot was five works; it was changed that year to six, with each initial nominator limited to five nominations. Worldcons are generally held near Labor Day, and are held in a different city around the world each year. Members are permitted to vote "no award", if they feel that none of the nominees is deserving of the award that year, and in the case that "no award" takes the majority the Hugo is not given in that category. This happened in both the Short Form and Long Form categories in 2015.

Winners and nominees 
In the following tables, the years correspond to the date of the ceremony. Editors are eligible based on their work of the previous calendar year, and each date links to the "year in literature" article corresponding with when those works were eligible. Although the Best Professional Editor award is not given explicitly for any particular editing effort and such works are not recorded by the World Science Fiction Society, works that the editor in question was involved with in the eligibility period are listed. This list includes magazines or anthologies that the editor worked on and publishing houses that he or she was employed at, and is not intended to be comprehensive. Entries with a blue background and an asterisk (*) next to the editor's name have won the award; those with a white background are the nominees on the short-list.

Best Professional Editor
  *   Winners and joint winners
  +   No winner selected

Long Form 
Starting with the 2007 awards, the Professional Editor award was split into two categories: Best Editor (Long Form) and Best Editor (Short Form). The Long Form award is for "The editor of at least four novel-length works primarily devoted to science fiction and/or fantasy published in the previous calendar year" in the official Hugo Award rules.

Short Form 
The Best Editor Short Form award, also started in 2007, is given to "the editor of at least four anthologies, collections or magazine issues primarily devoted to science fiction and/or fantasy, at least one of which was published in the previous calendar year."

Retro Hugos 
Beginning with the 1996 Worldcon, the World Science Fiction Society created the concept of "Retro Hugos", in which the Hugo award could be retroactively awarded for years 50, 75, or 100 years before the current year, if no awards were originally given that year. Retro Hugos have been awarded seven times, for 1939, 1941, 1943–1946, 1951, and 1954. In 1946, 1951, and 1954 the award was given for Best Professional Editor, as the category had not been split, while for the others it was given for Short Form only, as Long Form did not have enough responses to make a ballot.

Notes

References

External links
Hugo Awards official site

Editor awards (print)
Professional Editor